Fire Dancer is a 2002 film directed by an Afghan-American, Jawed Wassel. It was the first Afghan film to be submitted for an Academy Award.

See also
Submissions for the 75th Academy Award for Best Foreign Language Film

Fire dancer
Original artwork by Dave Matthews, a logo that has become a unique representation of the Dave Matthews Band.

External links

 http://www.rottentomatoes.com/m/firedancer/
 http://movies.go.com/firedancer/d776981/drama
 https://web.archive.org/web/20071111132408/http://www.afghancinema.com/more.html

2002 films
2002 drama films
American drama films
Dari-language films
Films shot in Afghanistan
Afghan drama films
2000s English-language films
2000s American films